This is the complete list of Olympic medalists in shooting.

Current program

Men

Air pistol

Air rifle

Rapid fire pistol
{| 
|-
|1896 Athens
|
|
|
|-
|1900 Paris
|
|
|
|-
| 1904–1908 ||colspan=3 align=center|not included in the Olympic program
|-
|1912 Stockholm
|
|
|
|-
| 1920 Antwerp ||colspan=3 align=center|not included in the Olympic program|-
|1924 Paris
|
|
|
|-
| 1928 Amsterdam ||colspan=3 align=center|not included in the Olympic program|-
|1932 Los Angeles
|
|
|
|-
|1936 Berlin
|
|
|
|-
|1948 London
|
|
|
|-
|1952 Helsinki
|
|
|
|-
|1956 Melbourne
|
|
|
|-
| 1960 Rome
| 
| 
| 
|-
| 1964 Tokyo
| 
| 
| 
|-
| 1968 Mexico City
| 
| 
| 
|-
| 1972 Munich
| 
| 
| 
|-
| 1976 Montreal
| 
| 
| 
|-
| 1980 Moscow
| 
| 
| 
|-
| 1984 Los Angeles
| 
| 
| 
|-
| 1988 Seoul
| 
| 
| 
|-
| 1992 Barcelona
| 
| 
| 
|-
| 1996 Atlanta
| 
| 
| 
|-
| 2000 Sydney
| 
| 
| 
|-
| 2004 Athens
| 
| 
| 
|-
|2008 Beijing
|
|
|
|-
|2012 London
|
|
|
|-
|2016 Rio de Janeiro
| 
|
|  
|-
|2020 Tokyo
| 
| 
| 
|-
|2024 Paris
|
|
|
|-
|}

Rifle three positions
This event has also been known as small-bore rifle three positions and free rifle three positions.

From 1972 to 1980, this event was mixed (open to both men and women shooters), although only one medal was won by a woman at these Games – Margaret Murdock's silver medal in 1976.

Skeet

From 1972 to 1992, this event was mixed (open to both men and women shooters), although only one medal was won by a woman at these Games – Zhang Shan's gold medal in 1992.

Trap

Women

Air pistol

Air rifle

Pistol
This event has also been known as sport pistol.

Rifle three positions
This event has also been known as standard rifle and sport rifle.

In addition to this list,  won a silver medal in this event in 1976, when it was a mixed event (open to both men and women).

Skeet

In addition to this list,  won a gold medal in this event in 1992, when it was a mixed event (open to both men and women).

Trap

Mixed
Air pistol, team

Air rifle, team

Skeet, team
Coming soon

Discontinued events
Men's
Double trap

 25 meter military pistol, individual 

30 meter rapid fire pistol

30 meter rapid fire pistol, team

200 meter military rifle, individual

300 meter military rifle; prone, individual

300 meter military rifle; prone, team

300 meter military rifle; standing, individual

300 meter military rifle; standing, team

300 meter military rifle, three positions

300 meter military rifle, team

600 meter military rifle, individual

600 meter military rifle, team

300 meter + 600 meter military rifle, team

100 metre running deer; single shot, individual

100 metre running deer; single shot, team

100 metre running deer; double shot, individual

100 metre running deer; double shot, team

100 metre running deer; single shot and double shot

300 meter rifle kneeling

300 meter rifle prone

300 meter rifle standing

300 meter rifle three positions

In 1968 and 1972, this event was mixed (open to both men and women shooters), although all medals were won by men.

300 meter rifle, team

600 meter rifle, prone

1000 yard rifle, prone

rifle, disappearing target

rifle, moving target

rifle, stationary target

10 meter running target

50 meter running target

From 1972 to 1980, this event was mixed'' (open to both men and women shooters), although all competitors were men and all medals were won by men at these Games.

50 meter pistol, individual
This event has also been known as free pistol.

50 meter pistol, team

25 meter rifle, individual

25 meter rifle, team

50 meter rifle, team

50 meter rifle prone
This event has also been known as small-bore rifle prone and free rifle prone.

Trap, team

Women's

double trap

See also
List of Asian Games medalists in shooting
Shooting at the 1906 Intercalated Games — these Intercalated Games are no longer regarded as official Games by the current International Olympic Committee

References

 International Olympic Committee results database

Shooting
medalists

Olympic